Marc Fred Tsoungui (born 30 July 2002) is a professional footballer who plays as a left-back for Swiss Challenge League club Lausanne-Ouchy. Born in Cameroon, he represents Switzerland internationally.

Career
In 2020, Tsoungui signed for FC Lausanne-Sport on 1 August 2020. He made his professional debut with FC Lausanne-Sport in a 4–0 Swiss Super League win over FC Zürich on 3 October 2020.

On 14 February 2022, Tsoungui moved to Lausanne-Ouchy on loan. On 27 June 2022, he moved to Lausanne-Ouchy on a permanent basis.

References

External links
 
 
 SFL Profile
 Football.ch U16 Profile
 Football.ch U17 Profile

Living people
2002 births
Footballers from Yaoundé
Swiss men's footballers
Switzerland youth international footballers
Cameroonian footballers
Cameroonian emigrants to Switzerland
Swiss people of Cameroonian descent
Swiss sportspeople of African descent
Association football defenders
S.S.C. Napoli players
FC Lausanne-Sport players
FC Stade Lausanne Ouchy players
Swiss Super League players
Swiss expatriate footballers
Swiss expatriate sportspeople in Italy
Expatriate footballers in Italy